This was the first edition of the tournament.

Jason Kubler won the title after defeating Brayden Schnur 6–4, 6–2 in the final.

Seeds

Draw

Finals

Top half

Bottom half

References
Main Draw
Qualifying Draw

City of Playford Tennis International - Men's Singles